Putna is a surname. Notable people with the surname include:

Andrew Putna (born 1994), American soccer player
Vitovt Putna (1893–1937), Soviet Red Army officer of Lithuanian origin
Martin C. Putna (born 1968), Czech literary historian, university teacher, publicist, and essayist

See also